Discurria is a genus of sea snail. A true limpet, it is a marine gastropod mollusk in the family Lottiidae.

Species
Species within the genus Discurria include:
 Discurria insessa 
 Discurria radiata

References

 Taxonomicon info

Lottiidae